Trevor Anthony Ariza (born June 30, 1985) is an American professional basketball player who last played for the Los Angeles Lakers of the National Basketball Association (NBA). He won an NBA championship in his first stint with the Lakers in 2009.  He played college basketball for one season with the UCLA Bruins before being selected as the 43rd pick of the 2004 NBA draft by the New York Knicks. He also previously played for the Orlando Magic, Houston Rockets, New Orleans Hornets, Washington Wizards, Phoenix Suns, Sacramento Kings, Portland Trail Blazers, and Miami Heat.

High school and college career
Ariza attended Westchester High School in Los Angeles, where as a junior in 2001–02, he combined with teammates and fellow future NBA players Hassan Adams, Brandon Heath, and Bobby Brown to lead the Comets to the California State championship. Considered a five-star recruit by Rivals.com, Ariza was listed as the No. 5 power forward and the No. 18 player in the nation in 2003.

As a freshman at UCLA in 2003–04, Ariza played in 25 games (23 starts) and averaged 11.6 points, 6.5 rebounds and a team-high 1.7 steals. He subsequently earned All-Pac 10 Freshman Team honors. He declared for the NBA Draft following his freshman campaign at UCLA.

Professional career

New York Knicks (2004–2006)
Ariza was selected by the New York Knicks in the second round (43rd overall) of the 2004 NBA draft. He played in 80 games during his rookie campaign with New York and averaged 5.9 points, 3.0 rebounds and 1.1 assists per game. At the time, he became the youngest player to ever wear a Knicks uniform (19 years, four months and four days old). His 80 games and 1,382 minutes were the most played by a Knicks rookie since Greg Anthony in 1991–92 (82 games played).

Orlando Magic (2006–2007)
In February 2006, Ariza was traded along with Penny Hardaway to the Orlando Magic in exchange for Steve Francis. After the trade, he played in 21 games and averaged 4.7 points per game for the rest of the season. In the 2006–07 season he played in 57 games and started in 7. he averaged 8.9 points along with 4.4 rebounds and 1.1 assists.

Los Angeles Lakers (2007–2009)

In November 2007, Ariza was traded to the Los Angeles Lakers in exchange for Brian Cook and Maurice Evans. He fractured a bone in his right foot in January 2008, but made his return in Game 2 of the Western Conference Finals against the San Antonio Spurs in late May, scoring a basket within his first minute of play. The Lakers went on to defeat the Spurs in 5 games and advance to the 2008 NBA Finals, but lost to the Boston Celtics in 6 games.

In the 2008–09 season, he played in all 82 games, starting 20. Ariza was ejected during a game against Portland on March 9, 2009, following a flagrant foul on Rudy Fernández. On March 15, 2009 versus the Dallas Mavericks, Ariza scored a career-high 26 points along with 3 steals, 3 rebounds, and 2 assists. After becoming a starter, he began to show more ability on defense.

In the playoffs, Ariza scored a playoff career-high 21 points in Game 1 of the first round against Utah Jazz. In the Western Conference Finals against the Denver Nuggets, Ariza stole an inbound pass from Chauncey Billups in Game 1 to help Lakers beat the Nuggets. In Game 3, the Lakers led by two points with 37.1 seconds remaining when Ariza stole Kenyon Martin's pass to Carmelo Anthony near midcourt to help Lakers take a 2–1 lead. The Lakers eventually won the series 4–2, sending them to the NBA Finals against the Orlando Magic. In Game 4 of the Finals, Ariza, who was 0-for-6 in the first half, scored 13 in the third quarter to help the Lakers win in overtime and finished the game with nine rebounds and three 3-pointers. The Lakers went on to win their 15th NBA title in five games, 4–1. Ariza averaged a career-high 11.3 points and 4.2 rebounds and shot 50% from three-point range in the playoffs.

Houston Rockets (2009–2010)

On July 3, 2009, Ariza reached an agreement with the Houston Rockets worth $33 million over five years. Ariza was signed using the Disabled Player Exception the Rockets were granted for injured center Yao Ming. On October 31, 2009, against the Portland Trail Blazers, Ariza scored a career high 33 points in a 111–107 Rockets win. On December 13, 2009, Ariza was ejected after he attempted to punch DeMar DeRozan of the Toronto Raptors after having the ball stolen by him. He was subsequently suspended for one game. On April 14, 2010, in the Rockets' final game of the season, Ariza recorded his first career triple-double, tallying 26 points, 10 rebounds, and 10 assists.

New Orleans Hornets (2010–2012)
On August 11, 2010, Ariza was traded to the New Orleans Hornets as part of a four-team, five-player trade, with Darren Collison and James Posey going to the Indiana Pacers, Troy Murphy to the New Jersey Nets, and Courtney Lee to Houston. During the 2011 NBA playoffs, Ariza logged career highs in minutes per game (40.2), points per game (15.5) rebounds (6.5) and assists (3.3). The Hornets lost to the Los Angeles Lakers in 6 games in the first round.

Washington Wizards (2012–2014)
On June 20, 2012, Ariza and Emeka Okafor were traded to the Washington Wizards for Rashard Lewis and a draft pick to the New Orleans Hornets.

On February 12, 2014, Ariza recorded a career-high 10 made three-pointers to score a season-high 32 points, as well as 11 rebounds, 3 assists and 3 steals, in a 113–112 loss to the Houston Rockets.

On March 1, 2014, Ariza recorded a career-high 40 points, including eight 3-pointers, in a 122–103 victory over the Philadelphia 76ers.

On April 27, 2014, Ariza set a playoff career-high 30 points against the Chicago Bulls in Game 4 of their 2014 NBA Playoffs first-round match-up, which the Wizards won 98–89. The team went on to lose to the Indiana Pacers in six games in the conference semifinals.

Return to Houston (2014–2018)
On July 15, 2014, Ariza was re-acquired by the Houston Rockets in a three-team sign-and-trade deal that also involved the New Orleans Pelicans, which sent Omer Asik and Omri Casspi to the Pelicans, Melvin Ely to the Wizards, and Ariza, along with Alonzo Gee and Scotty Hopson, to the Rockets.

On February 6, 2015, he tied a season-high with 24 points in a 117–111 wina's streak of 172 straight games played.

On January 24, 2016, he scored a season-high 29 points and made a season-high six three-pointers in a 115–104 win over the Dallas Mavericks. He topped that mark the following night, scoring 31 points in a 112–111 win over the New Orleans Pelicans. On February 27, he made two three-pointers against the San Antonio Spurs to extend his streak with at least one three-pointer to 29 games, the longest streak by a Rockets player since 39 in a row by Aaron Brooks in the 2009–10 season. The streak ended at 30 after shooting 0-of-8 from three-point range against the New Orleans Pelicans on March 2.

On January 17, 2018, Ariza was suspended for two games without pay for entering the Los Angeles Clippers' locker room after a game against the team two days earlier.

In Game 2 of the 2018 Western Conference Finals, on May 17, 2018, Ariza helped tie the series with 19 points and 6 assists in a 127-105 victory over the Golden State Warriors. In Game 7 of the series, a deciding loss, Ariza missed all 9 of his 3-point attempts, and the Rockets set an NBA playoff record for most consecutive 3-point attempts missed with 27.

Phoenix Suns (2018)
On July 6, 2018, Ariza signed a one-year, $15 million contract with the Phoenix Suns. In his debut for the Suns in their season opener on October 17, 2018, Ariza recorded 21 points, eight rebounds and seven assists in a 121–100 win over the Dallas Mavericks.

Return to Washington (2018–2019)
On December 17, 2018, Ariza was traded to the Washington Wizards for Austin Rivers and Kelly Oubre Jr. On January 13, 2019, he narrowly missed his second career triple-double, recording 23 points, 10 assists and nine rebounds in a 140–138 double-overtime loss to the Toronto Raptors.

Sacramento Kings (2019–2020)
On July 7, 2019, Ariza inked a two-year deal worth $25 million with the Sacramento Kings. On January 6, 2020, Ariza scored a season-high 18 points and grabbed 6 rebounds in a 111-99 win over the Golden State Warriors.

Portland Trail Blazers (2020)
On January 20, 2020, Ariza was traded to the Portland Trail Blazers along with Wenyen Gabriel and Caleb Swanigan in exchange for future teammate Kent Bazemore, Anthony Tolliver, and two future second-round draft picks.

On June 22, 2020, Ariza announced he would not be returning to the NBA season's restart in Orlando. Instead, he committed to a one-month visitation window with his young son, sources told ESPN.

On November 22, 2020, Ariza, the draft rights to Isaiah Stewart, and a conditional future first round pick were traded to the Houston Rockets in exchange for Robert Covington. On November 24, Ariza and Stewart were traded to the Detroit Pistons in exchange for Christian Wood, as part of a sign-and-trade deal. On November 27, Ariza, Justin Jackson, a 2023 second-round pick (from either Dallas or Miami), and a 2026 second-round pick were traded to the Oklahoma City Thunder in a three-team trade involving the Detroit Pistons. Ariza never reported to the Thunder or appeared in any games for them during his stint, as he was away from the team due to family matters.

Miami Heat (2021)
On March 17, 2021, Ariza was traded to his hometown team the Miami Heat in exchange for center Meyers Leonard and a future second round draft pick. It was the ninth time that he had been traded in his career, the most in NBA history. 
He played 30 games and started 27 of them, averaging 9.4 points, 1.8 assists, and 4.8 rebounds.

Return to the Lakers (2021–2022)
On August 6, 2021, Ariza signed with the Los Angeles Lakers on a one-year deal worth $2.6 million. On October 6, he underwent a procedure on his right ankle. He was out for most of the first half, which Lakers head coach Frank Vogel said "did derail most of his season and his impact on our team this year". On April 7, 2022, Ariza was waived. He played in 24 games with 11 starts, averaging four points and shooting 33.3%.

Personal life
On March 18, 1996, Ariza's youngest brother, Tajh Ariza, died after falling out of a hotel room window in Caracas, Venezuela. His first son is named after his late brother. Ariza also has two children with his wife: son Tristan and daughter Taylor.

Ariza's stepfather, Kenny McClary, played at the University of Florida in the mid to late 1980s, and professionally with the Sydney Kings in Australia.

Ariza is of Turks & Caicos Islands and Dominican descent through his grandfather Osvaldo Ariza (a Turks and Caicos Islander of Dominican descent), and his parents, Lolita Ariza and Trevor Saunders of Grand Turk. Ariza once considered changing his citizenship to play for the Dominican Republic national basketball team. However, he later accepted an invitation to the Team USA training camp.

NBA career statistics

Regular season

|-
| style="text-align:left;"| 
| style="text-align:left;"| New York
| 80 || 12 || 17.3 || .442 || .231 || .695 || 3.0 || 1.1 || .9 || .2 || 5.9
|-
| style="text-align:left;"| 
| style="text-align:left;"| New York
| 36 || 10 || 19.7 || .418 || .333 || .545 || 3.8 || 1.3 || 1.2 || .3 || 4.6
|-
| style="text-align:left;"| 
| style="text-align:left;"| Orlando
| 21 || 0 || 13.8 || .400 || .000 || .700 || 3.9 || .7 || .7 || .1 || 4.7
|-
| style="text-align:left;"| 
| style="text-align:left;"| Orlando
| 57 || 7 || 22.4 || .539 || .000 || .620 || 4.4 || 1.1 || 1.0 || .3 || 8.9
|-
| style="text-align:left;"| 
| style="text-align:left;"| Orlando
| 11 || 0 || 10.5 || .452 || .000 || .533 || 2.2 || .7 || .5 || .3 || 3.3
|-
| style="text-align:left;"| 
| style="text-align:left;"| L.A. Lakers
| 24 || 3 || 18.0 || .524 || .333 || .683 || 3.5 || 1.5 || 1.1 || .3 || 6.5
|-
| style="text-align:left;background:#afe6ba;"| †
| style="text-align:left;"| L.A. Lakers
| style="background:#cfecec;"|  82* || 20 || 24.4 || .460 || .319 || .710 || 4.3 || 1.8 || 1.7 || .3 || 8.9
|-
| style="text-align:left;"| 
| style="text-align:left;"| Houston
| 72 || 71 || 36.5 || .394 || .334 || .649 || 5.6 || 3.8 || 1.8 || .6 || 14.9
|-
| style="text-align:left;"| 
| style="text-align:left;"| New Orleans
| 75 || 75 || 34.7 || .398 || .303 || .701 || 5.4 || 2.2 || 1.6 || .4 || 11.0
|-
| style="text-align:left;"| 
| style="text-align:left;"| New Orleans
| 41 || 41 || 32.9 || .417 || .333 || .775 || 5.2 || 3.3 || 1.7 || .6 || 10.8
|-
| style="text-align:left;"| 
| style="text-align:left;"| Washington
| 56 || 15 || 26.3 || .417 || .364 || .821 || 4.8 || 2.0 || 1.3 || .4 || 9.5
|-
| style="text-align:left;"| 
| style="text-align:left;"| Washington
| 77 || 77 || 35.4 || .456 || .407 || .772 || 6.2 || 2.5 || 1.6 || .3 || 14.4
|-
| style="text-align:left;"| 
| style="text-align:left;"| Houston
| 82 || 82 || 35.7 || .402 || .350 || .853 || 5.6 || 2.5 || 1.9 || .3 || 12.8
|-
| style="text-align:left;"| 
| style="text-align:left;"| Houston
| 81 || 81 || 35.3 || .416 || .371  || .783 || 4.5 || 2.3 || 2.0 || .3 || 12.7
|-
| style="text-align:left;"| 
| style="text-align:left;"| Houston
| 80 || 80 || 34.7 || .409 || .344  || .738 || 5.7 || 2.2 || 1.8 || .3 || 11.7
|-
| style="text-align:left;"|
| style="text-align:left;"| Houston
| 67 || 67 || 33.9 || .412 || .368  || .854 || 4.4 || 1.6 || 1.5 || .2 || 11.7
|-
| style="text-align:left;"|
| style="text-align:left;"| Phoenix
| 26 || 26 || 34.0 || .379 || .360  || .837 || 5.6 || 3.3 || 1.5 || .3 || 9.9
|-
| style="text-align:left;"|
| style="text-align:left;"| Washington
| 43 || 43 || 34.1 || .409 || .322  || .777 || 5.3 || 3.8 || 1.2 || .3 || 14.1
|-
| style="text-align:left;"|
| style="text-align:left;"| Sacramento
| 32 || 0 || 24.7 || .388 || .352  || .778 || 4.6 || 1.6 || 1.1 || .2 || 6.0
|-
| style="text-align:left;"|
| style="text-align:left;"| Portland
| 21 || 21 || 33.4 || .491 || .400  || .872 || 4.8 || 2.0 || 1.6 || .4 || 11.0
|-
| style="text-align:left;"|
| style="text-align:left;"| Miami
| 30 || 27 || 28.0 || .411 || .350  || .773 || 4.8 || 1.8 || 1.0 || .6 || 9.4
|-
| style="text-align:left;"|
| style="text-align:left;"| L.A. Lakers
| 24 || 11 || 19.3 || .333 || .270  || .556 || 3.4 || 1.1 || .5 || .3 || 4.0
|- class="sortbottom"
| style="text-align:center;" colspan="2" | Career
| 1,118 || 769 || 29.5 || .422 || .351 || .731 || 4.8 || 2.1 || 1.5 || .3 || 10.4

Playoffs

|-
| style="text-align:left;"| 2007
| style="text-align:left;"| Orlando
| 4 || 0 || 11.8 || .313 || .000 || .250 || 2.3 || 1.3 || .2 || 0 || 2.8
|-
| style="text-align:left;"| 2008
| style="text-align:left;"| L.A. Lakers
| 8 || 0 || 5.6 || .583 || .250 || .500 || 1.4 || .1 || .1 || .1 || 2.1
|-
| style="text-align:left;background:#afe6ba;"| 2009†
| style="text-align:left;"| L.A. Lakers
| 23 || 23 || 31.4 || .497 || .476 || .563 || 4.2 || 2.3 || 1.6 || .4 || 11.3
|-
| style="text-align:left;"| 2011
| style="text-align:left;"| New Orleans
| 6 || 6 || 40.2 ||.412 ||.333 || .727 || 6.5 || 3.3 || 1.3 || .5 || 15.5
|-
| style="text-align:left;"| 2014
| style="text-align:left;"| Washington
| 11 || 11 || 37.0 || .481 || .446 || .778 || 8.9 || 1.7 || 1.5 || .4 || 13.6
|-
| style="text-align:left;"| 2015
| style="text-align:left;"| Houston
| 17 || 17 || 38.5 || .426 || .375 || .905 || 6.4 || 2.6 || 1.8 || .1 || 13.2
|-
| style="text-align:left;"| 2016
| style="text-align:left;"| Houston
| 5 || 5 || 36.2 || .255 || .143 || .750 || 4.2 || .8 || style="background:#cfecec;"|  2.6* || .2 || 6.6
|-
| style="text-align:left;"| 2017
| style="text-align:left;"| Houston
| 11 || 11 || 37.5 || .423 || .377 || .929 || 5.1 || 2.1 || 1.3 || .2 || 10.7
|-
| style="text-align:left;"| 2018
| style="text-align:left;"| Houston
| 17 || 17 || 34.2 || .360 || .286 || .742 || 3.8 || 1.3 || 1.1 || .1 || 8.8
|-
| style="text-align:left;"| 2021
| style="text-align:left;"| Miami
| 4 || 4 || 24.0 || .304 || .294 || .000 || 5.8 || .5 || .8 || .3 || 4.8
|- class="sortbottom"
| style="text-align:center;" colspan="2" | Career
| 106 || 94 || 32.0 || .423 || .365 || .722 || 5.0 || 1.8 || 1.3 || .2 || 10.1

See also
 List of National Basketball Association career steals leaders
 List of National Basketball Association career 3-point scoring leaders

References

External links

Trevor Ariza is easy to miss. He shouldn't be.

1985 births
Living people
American men's basketball players
American people of Turks and Caicos Islands descent
American sportspeople of Dominican Republic descent
Basketball players from Miami
Houston Rockets players
Los Angeles Lakers players
Miami Heat players
New Orleans Hornets players
New York Knicks draft picks
New York Knicks players
Orlando Magic players
Parade High School All-Americans (boys' basketball)
Phoenix Suns players
Portland Trail Blazers players
Sacramento Kings players
Small forwards
UCLA Bruins men's basketball players
Washington Wizards players
Westchester High School (Los Angeles) alumni